{{DISPLAYTITLE:C14H20N2O}}
The molecular formula C14H20N2O may refer to:

 5-Ethoxy-DMT
 4-HO-DET, a psychedelic drug
 4-HO-MiPT
 4-HO-MPT
 5-MeO-MET
 5-Methoxy-2,N,N-trimethyltryptamine
 5-Methoxy-7,N,N-trimethyltryptamine
 Pyrrocaine
 Tymazoline